Benjamin W. Best House is a historic house located near Jason, Greene County, North Carolina.

Description and history 
It was built about 1850, and is a two-story, three bay, Greek Revival style heavy timber frame dwelling. It has a two-story rear ell and low hip roof. When threatened with demolition, it was moved to its present location in 1998.

It was listed on the National Register of Historic Places on February 3, 2006.

References

Houses on the National Register of Historic Places in North Carolina
Greek Revival houses in North Carolina
Houses completed in 1850
Houses in Greene County, North Carolina
National Register of Historic Places in Greene County, North Carolina